Inside Out is the ninth studio album by American country music singer Trisha Yearwood, released in 2001.

The album reached #1 on the Billboard country albums chart. On UK, Asian, and Australian pressings, "You're Where I Belong" was included as a bonus track. In the U.S., "I Would've Loved You Anyway" and the title track, a duet with Don Henley, were both released as singles; they peaked at #4 and #31, respectively, on the Billboard country charts. "I Don't Paint Myself into Corners" and "Melancholy Blue" were originally recorded by Rebecca Lynn Howard on her self-titled debut album. Yearwood's rendition of the former was a #47 hit for her in 2002, while Howard's was a #67 in 2000.

Vince Gill provided background vocals for "I Don't Paint Myself into Corners." The title track marks the first time Don Henley served as Yearwood's duet partner since 1992's "Walkaway Joe." The album includes a cover version of Rosanne Cash's "Seven Year Ache," with Cash even providing background vocals. The album was given a positive review by Allmusic, saying it was "bound to inspire fans and fellow artists alike."

Track listing

Personnel 
 Trisha Yearwood – lead vocals, backing vocals
 Steve Nathan – acoustic piano, keyboards
 Matt Rollings – acoustic piano, keyboards, clavinet
 B. James Lowry – acoustic guitars
 Brent Rowan – electric guitars
 Steuart Smith – electric guitars 
 Paul Franklin – steel guitar
 Michael Rhodes – bass guitar
 Shannon Forrest – drums
 Eric Darken – percussion
 Jim Hoke – harmonica
 Jim Horn – saxophone
 Bobby Keys – saxophone
 Vicki Hampton – backing vocals
 Liana Manis – backing vocals
 Kim Richey – backing vocals
 Karyn Rochelle – backing vocals
 Rosanne Cash – backing vocals (4)
 Vince Gill – backing vocals (5)
 Don Henley – lead and backing  vocals (7)
 Garth Brooks – lead and backing vocals (13)

Strings
 Kristin Wilkinson – string arrangements and conductor
 Craig Nelson – bass
 John Catchings – cello
 Monisa Angell – viola
 Jim Grosjean – viola
 David Davidson – violin 
 Carl Gorodetzky – violin
 Gary Vanosdale – violin

Production 
 Mark Wright – producer (1-12)
 Trisha Yearwood – producer (1-12)
 Allen Reynolds – producer (13)
 Greg Droman – recording, mixing, overdub recording 
 Steve Marcantonio – overdub recording 
 Justin Niebank – recording
 Tony Green – assistant engineer
 Todd Gunnerson – assistant engineer, mix assistant 
 Hank Williams – mastering
 MasterMix (Nashville, Tennessee) – mastering location 
 Jessie Noble – project coordinator
 Virginia Team – art direction 
 Chris Ferrara – design
 Russ Harrington – photography
 Sheri McCoy – stylist 
 Maria Smoot – hair stylist
 Mary Beth Felts – make-up

Charts

Weekly charts

Year-end charts

Singles

Certifications

References

External links

2001 albums
Trisha Yearwood albums
MCA Records albums
Albums produced by Mark Wright (record producer)